Lick It Up is a 1983 album by the American hard rock/heavy metal band Kiss.

Lick It Up may also refer to:

"Lick It Up" (song), the title track of the Kiss album
"Lick It Up", a song by Deep Purple from their 1993 album The Battle Rages On